The 2016 season of Clube Desportivo Primeiro de Agosto is the club's 38th season in the Girabola, the Angolan Premier football League and 38th consecutive season in the top flight of Angolan football. In 2016,  the club participated in the Girabola and the Angola Cup.

Squad information

Players

Staff

Pre-season transfers

Overview

Angolan League

League table

Results

Results summary

Results by round

Match Details

Angola Cup

Round of 16

FESA Tournament

Preliminary round

1st place match

Season statistics

Total results

Appearances and goals

|-
! colspan="10" style="background:#DCDCDC; text-align:center" | Goalkeepers

|-
! colspan="10" style="background:#DCDCDC; text-align:center" | Defenders

|-
! colspan="10" style="background:#DCDCDC; text-align:center" | Midfielders

|-
! colspan="10" style="background:#DCDCDC; text-align:center" | Forwards

|-
! colspan="10" style="background:#DCDCDC; text-align:center" | Total
|- align=center
| colspan="4"| || 308 || 60 || 308 || 60 || 11 || 0

Scorers

Clean sheets

See also
 List of C.D. Primeiro de Agosto players

External links
 Match details
 Zerozero.pt profile

References

C.D. Primeiro de Agosto seasons
Primeiro de Agosto